Bharavi was a 6th century Indian poet known for his epic poem Kirātārjunīya, one of the six mahakavyas in classical Sanskrit.

Time and place 
As with most Sanskrit poets, very few concrete details are available about Bharavi's life, and inferences must be made from references to him. His name, along with great poet and dramatist in the Sanskrit language Kālidāsa's name, is mentioned in a Chalukya stone inscription dated 634 C.E. found at Aihole, located in present day Karnataka. In another inscription, the king Durvinita of the Western Ganga Dynasty mentions having written a commentary on the fifteenth canto of Bharavi's Kirātārjunīya. The Western Ganga Dynasty ruled from about the middle of the fourth century, and Durvinita is usually believed to have lived in the later half of the sixth century.

Avanti-sundara-katha-sara description 

In Avanti-sundari-katha-sara, a work attributed to the 7th-century Dandin, a visitor to the court of the Pallava king Simhavishnu narrates a Sanskrit verse by Damodara to the king. The king is impressed and asks about the composer of the verse, and the visitor provides the following information: Damodara was the son of Narayana-svami of Kaushika gotra. His ancestors had migrated from Anandapura to Achalapura in Nasikya. Damodara was a friemd of poet Bharavi. Damodara was a vegetarian, and considered meat-eating a sin. He accompanied his friend prince Vishnu-vardhana on a hunting expedition, during which he was forced to eat meat. To expiate this sin, he set on a pilgrimage, during which he entered the court of the Ganga king Durvinita. King Simhavishnu invites Damodara to his court. The poet responds after several invitations, and lives in the company of prince Mahendra-vikrama. Damodara had a son Manoratha, and Dandin was the grandson of Manoratha.

The above legend suggests that Bharavi was a court poet of Simhavishnu and Durvinita. Avanti-sundari-katha, the prose text ascribed to Dandin, states that Damodara was another poet who became a friend of prince Vishnuvardhana, after Bharavi introduced the two men.

Work

Bharavi's only known work is Kirātārjunīya, an eighteen canto epic poem, the story for which comes from the Mahābhārata. Kirātārjunīya "is regarded to be the most powerful poem in the Sanskrit language". A. K. Warder considers it the "most perfect epic available to us", over Aśvaghoṣa's Buddhacarita, noting his greater force of expression, with more concentration and polish in every detail. Despite using extremely difficult language and rejoicing in the finer points of Sanskrit grammar, he achieves conciseness and directness. His alliteration, "crisp texture of sound", and choice of metre closely correspond to the narrative.

His poetry is characterised by its intricate styles and ethereal expressions. Like Kalidasa for his similes (upamā) and Daṇḍin for his wordplay (padalālityam), Bharavi is known for his "weight of meaning" (arthagauravam). 

It is thought that Bharavi's Kiratarjuniya influenced the 8th century CE poet Magha's Shishupala Vadha.

Notes

Sources
 

Indian male poets
Sanskrit poets
6th-century Indian poets
6th-century Indian writers